The 2014 Indian general election in Sikkim was held for the lone Lok Sabha seat in the state. The voting process was held in a single phase on 12 April 2014.

Result

|- align=center
!style="background-color:#E9E9E9" class="unsortable"|
!style="background-color:#E9E9E9" align=center|Political Party
!style="background-color:#E9E9E9" |Seats won
!style="background-color:#E9E9E9" |Seat change
|-
| 
|align="left"|Sikkim Democratic Front||1||
|-
|
|align="left"|Total||1||
|}

List of elected MPs
Keys:

References

Indian general elections in Sikkim
2010s in Sikkim
2014 Indian general election by state or union territory